Bush Davies School of Theatre Arts was a dance and performing arts school in the United Kingdom. Founded by the dance teacher Pauline Bush in Nottingham in 1914, and later with branches in Romford, Essex and London; it was bombed out during the Second World War and then moved to a former boys' school East Grinstead. The Romford branch closed in 1974 and the East Grinstead branch in 1989. After Pauline Bush's death, the school was run by her daughter Noreen and her husband Victor Leopold. Later their son Paul Kimm joined them, and he remained Principal until the school closed.

Productions
In May 1959, Marjorie Davies produced and directed the musical "What Katy Did" by Jo Masters, which starred students of the Bush Davies School with Pat Goh as Katy.

In 1974, Susan Passmore and Raymond Bishop produced the annual July performance 'Time Steps' in celebration of the school's Diamond Jubilee in the Adeline Genee Theatre. The 330-seat theatre opened in 1967 on land gifted by the school with a performance of Coppelia. The school staged an annual production each summer. The Theatre was demolished by the owners of the residential care home that now operates in Charters Towers and the grounds of the old school.

Notable students

Holly Aird, actress
Fairuza Balk, actress
Doreen Bird, founder of Bird College
Warren Carlyle, choreographer
Judy Carne, actress
Lauren Christy, singer-songwriter and producer
Gemma Craven, actress
Suzanne Danielle, actress
Louise Fribo, actress
Francesca Jaynes, choreographer
Betty Laine, dancer and founder of Laine Theatre Arts
Jane Leeves, Daphne Moon in Frasier
Lisa Kay, Actress & Voiceover Artist
Fiona Mollison, actress
John Partridge, actor and dancer
Natalie Roles, actress
Saffron (singer), singer, dancer and actress
Simon Shelton, Dancer & Actor (Tinky Winky)
Polly Walker, television and film actress
Doreen Wells, ballet dancer
Lorna Yabsley, actress and photographer

References

Drama schools in the United Kingdom
Ballet schools in the United Kingdom
Dance schools in the United Kingdom